Nicholas deBelleville  Katzenbach (January 17, 1922 – May 8, 2012) was an American lawyer who served as United States Attorney General during the Lyndon B. Johnson administration. He previously served as United States Deputy Attorney General under President John F. Kennedy.

Early life
Katzenbach was born in Philadelphia and raised in Trenton. His parents were Edward L. Katzenbach, who served as Attorney General of New Jersey, and Marie Hilson Katzenbach, who was the first female president of the New Jersey State Board of Education. His uncle, Frank S. Katzenbach, served as Mayor of Trenton, New Jersey and as a Justice of the New Jersey Supreme Court.

He was named after his mother's great-great-grandfather, Nicolas de Belleville (1753–1831), a French medical doctor who accompanied Kazimierz Pułaski to America and settled in Trenton in 1778. Katzenbach was raised an Episcopalian, and was partly of German descent.

He attended Phillips Exeter Academy and was accepted into Princeton University. Katzenbach was a junior at Princeton in 1941, enlisting right after Pearl Harbor, and served in the United States Army Air Corps in World War II. Assigned as a navigator in the 381st Bomb Squadron, 310th Bomb Group in North Africa. His B-25 Mitchell Bomber was shot down February 23, 1943, over the Mediterranean Sea off North Africa. He spent over two years as a prisoner of war in Italian and German POW camps, including Stalag Luft III, the site of the "Great Escape", which Katzenbach assisted in. He read extensively as a prisoner, and ran an informal class based on Principles of Common Law.

He received his B.A. cum laude from Princeton University in 1945 (partly based on Princeton giving him credit for the 500-odd books he had read in captivity). As part of his degree, Katzenbach completed a senior thesis titled The Little Steel Formula: An Historical Appraisal. He received an LL.B. cum laude from Yale Law School in 1947, where he served as Editor-in-Chief of the Yale Law Journal. From 1947 to 1949, he was a Rhodes Scholar at Balliol College, Oxford.

On June 8, 1946, Katzenbach married Lydia King Phelps Stokes, in a ceremony officiated by her uncle, Anson Phelps Stokes, former canon of the Washington National Cathedral. Her father was Harold Phelps Stokes, a newspaper correspondent and secretary to Herbert Hoover.

Katzenbach was admitted to the New Jersey bar in 1950 and the Connecticut bar in 1955. He was an associate in the law firm of Katzenbach, Gildea and Rudner in 1950.

Government service
From 1950 to 1952, he was attorney-advisor in the Office of General Counsel to the Secretary of the Air Force. Katzenbach was on the faculty of Rutgers Law School from 1950 to 1951; was an associate professor of law at Yale from 1952 to 1956; and was a professor of law at the University of Chicago from 1956 to 1960.

He served in the U.S. Department of Justice as Assistant Attorney General of the Office of Legal Counsel in 1961–1962 and as Deputy Attorney General appointed by President John F. Kennedy in  1962. After the assassination of President  Kennedy, Katzenbach continued to serve with the Johnson administration. On February 11, 1965 President Johnson appointed Katzenbach the 65th Attorney General of the United States, and he held the office until October 2, 1966. He then served as Under Secretary of State from 1966 to 1969.

In September 2008, Katzenbach published Some of It Was Fun: Working with RFK and LBJ (W. W. Norton), a memoir of his years in Government service.

The "Stand in the Schoolhouse Door"

On June 11, 1963, Katzenbach was a primary participant in one of the most famous incidents of the Civil Rights struggle. Alabama Governor George Wallace stood in front of Foster Auditorium at the University of Alabama in an attempt to stop desegregation of that institution by the enrollment of two black students, Vivian Malone and James Hood. This became known as the "Stand in the Schoolhouse Door". Hours later, Wallace stood aside only after being ordered to do so by Alabama National Guard General Henry V. Graham.

Role in JFK assassination investigation
Katzenbach has been credited with providing advice after the assassination of John F. Kennedy that led to the creation of the Warren Commission. On November 25, 1963, he sent a memo to Johnson's White House aide Bill Moyers recommending the creation of a Presidential Commission to investigate the assassination. To combat speculation of a conspiracy, Katzenbach said the results of the FBI's investigation should be made public. He wrote, in part: "The public must be satisfied that Oswald was the assassin; that he did not have confederates who are still at large".

Four days after Katzenbach's memo, Johnson appointed some of the nation's most prominent figures, including the Chief Justice of the United States, to the Commission. Conspiracy theorists later called the memo, one of thousands of files released by the National Archives in 1994, the first sign of a cover-up by the government.

Later years
Katzenbach left government service to work for IBM in 1969, where he served as general counsel during the lengthy antitrust case filed by the Department of Justice seeking the break-up of IBM. He and Cravath, Swaine & Moore attorney Thomas Barr led the case for the computer giant for 13 years until the government finally decided to drop it in 1982. Later Katzenbach led the opposition against the case filed by the European Economic Community.

He retired from IBM in 1986 and became a partner at the firm of Riker, Danzig, Scherer, Hyland & Perretti in New Jersey. He was named chairman of the failing Bank of Credit and Commerce International (BCCI) in 1991.

In 1980, Katzenbach testified in the United States District Court for the District of Columbia for the defense of W. Mark Felt, later revealed to be the "Deep Throat" of the Watergate scandal and later Deputy Director of the FBI; accused and later found guilty of ordering illegal wiretaps on American citizens.

In December 1996, Katzenbach was one of New Jersey's fifteen members of the Electoral College, who cast their votes for the Clinton/Gore ticket.

Katzenbach also testified on behalf of President Clinton on December 8, 1998, before the House Judiciary Committee hearing, considering whether to impeach President Clinton.

On March 16, 2004, MCI Communications in a press release announced "its Board of Directors has elected former U.S. Attorney General Nicholas Katzenbach as non-executive Chairman of the Board, effective upon MCI's emergence from Chapter 11 protection. Katzenbach has been an MCI Board member since July 2002." MCI later merged with Verizon.

Katzenbach was a member of both the American Academy of Arts and Sciences and the American Philosophical Society.

Katzenbach and his wife Lydia retired to Princeton, New Jersey, with a summer home on Martha's Vineyard in West Tisbury, Massachusetts. His son is writer John Katzenbach. His daughter, Maria, is also a published novelist.

After the death of W. Willard Wirtz in April 2010, Katzenbach became the longest surviving former U.S. Cabinet member. Katzenbach died on May 8, 2012, at the age of 90.

See also
 Some of It Was Fun: Working with RFK and LBJ (W. W. Norton) – publisher web site
 Video: Nicholas Katzenbach talks about his youth (bigthink.com)
 Video: Nicholas Katzenbach on RFK and LBJ (bigthink.com)
 Video: Nicholas Katzenbach compares Vietnam and Iraq (bigthink.com)
 The Best and the Brightest
 Katzenbach appears in archival footage of his confrontation with Gov. Wallace in the movie Forrest Gump

References

Bibliography

External links
Oral History Interviews with Nicholas Katzenbach, from the Lyndon Baines Johnson Library
Artículo en español del diario "El País", 26 de mayo de 2012, "Nicholas Katzenbach, crucial político en la sombra"

“Eyes on the Prize; Interview with Nicholas deB. Katzenbach; Interview with Nicholas Katzenbach,”  1985-12-10, American Archive of Public Broadcasting

|-

|-

|-

1922 births
2012 deaths
Alumni of Balliol College, Oxford
American chief executives
American Episcopalians
American people of German descent
American people of French descent
American prisoners of war in World War II
United States Army Air Forces personnel of World War II
American Rhodes Scholars
Lawyers from Philadelphia
Lyndon B. Johnson administration cabinet members
20th-century American politicians
Connecticut lawyers
Katzenbach family
Military personnel from Philadelphia
New Jersey Democrats
New Jersey lawyers
People associated with the assassination of John F. Kennedy
Politicians from Philadelphia
Politicians from Trenton, New Jersey
Phillips Exeter Academy alumni
Princeton University alumni
Rutgers School of Law–Newark faculty
United States Army Air Forces officers
United States Assistant Attorneys General for the Office of Legal Counsel
United States Attorneys General
United States Deputy Attorneys General
1996 United States presidential electors
University of Chicago faculty
United States Under Secretaries of State
Writers from New Jersey
Writers from Philadelphia
Yale Law School alumni
Yale Law School faculty
World War II prisoners of war held by Italy
World War II prisoners of war held by Germany
People from Princeton, New Jersey
People from West Tisbury, Massachusetts
Stalag Luft III prisoners of World War II
Shot-down aviators
Members of the American Philosophical Society